The Küsten Canal, also known as the Coastal Canal, is a canal, about  long, that links the Dortmund–Ems Canal with the Hunte and thus the Weser rivers.

It was built from 1922 to 1935 by widening an already existing drainage channel and is used today, especially by the peat industry and for transporting coal from the Ruhrgebiet to Bremen.

History

Forces of the 4th Canadian (Armoured) Division assaulted over the canal on 19 April and secured a bridgehead at Edewechterdamm, after Polish formations of the 1st Armoured Division had taken over the previous Canadian position at Dörpen, 50 km. to the West. The Polish forces established a bridgehead towards Papenburg after two days of fierce fighting.

"Küsten Canal" was awarded as a battle honour to both Canadian and Polish units participating in actions near this canal:
To the Canadian British Columbia Regiment, Argyll and Sutherland Highlanders of Canada (Princess Louise's), Algonquin Regiment, Lake Superior Scottish Regiment, Lincoln and Welland Regiment, and Royal New Brunswick Regiment, and to the Polish 9th Light Infantry Battalion, 1st Light Anti-Air Artillery Regiment, and 2nd Motorized Artillery Regiment.

Data 
 Length: 
 Water depth: 
 Bridge clearance: 
 Category IV inland waterway

Route 
Ems near Dörpen – southern Papenburg – northern Friesoythe – Hunte in Oldenburg

In many places the canal runs parallel to the B 401.

See also 
c-Port, an association and trading estate on the canal.

References

External links 

Wasser- und Schifffahrtsamt Meppen 
Wasser- und Schifffahrtsamt Bremen 
Das Projekt Küstenkanal der Grundschule Friedrichsfehn 

Canals in Lower Saxony
Emsland (region)
CKusten Canal
CKusten Canal
Federal waterways in Germany
Canals opened in 1935